Hualin Temple, may refer to:

 Hualin Temple (Guangzhou), in Guangzhou, Guangdong, China
 Hualin Temple (Fuzhou), in Fuzhou, Fujian, China

Buddhist temple disambiguation pages